Songs of Enchantment is a novel by Nigerian author Ben Okri, the second book in a trilogy that started with The Famished Road (1991) and continues with Infinite Riches (1998). It was published in London in 1993 by Doubleday.

References

Novels by Ben Okri
Postcolonial novels
Nigerian magic realism novels
Nigerian fantasy novels
1993 Nigerian novels